The Cummins Creek Wilderness is a  wilderness area in the Siuslaw National Forest within the Oregon Coast.  It is one of three wilderness areas created in the Siuslaw in 1984, along with Drift Creek and Rock Creek.  It is "dedicated to preserve in a wilderness state, the last remaining virgin stands of Sitka spruce, western hemlock and Douglas-fir, in Oregon's coast lands."  Cummins Creek and nearby Cummins Ridge are named for F.L. Cummins, an early homesteader.

Topography
Cummins Ridge, which peaks at almost 2,000 feet, splits the rainforest in two. Cummins and Bob Creeks drain west through the dense rainforest to the Pacific Ocean.

Vegetation
The Cummins Creek Wilderness features the only old growth Sitka spruce forest in the Oregon Wilderness system. Some of these trees have a diameter of up to nine feet. Cummins and Bob Creeks are lined with red alder and bigleaf maple trees, and understory vegetation consists of rhododendron, salal, sword fern, salmon berry, and elderberry. Wildflowers in the Wilderness include monkey flower, aster, candy flower, and foxglove.

Wildlife
Wildlife in Cummins Creek Wilderness include salmon, steelhead and coastal cutthroat trout which spawn in the creek waters.  Roosevelt elk, black-tailed deer, black bear, and spotted owl make their home in the wilderness.

Recreation
Due to the area's thick vegetation, recreation is somewhat limited in Cummins Creek Wilderness.  The  Cummins Creek Loop Trail bisects and is the only trail within the wilderness area.  The trail follows an old logging road and eventually meets the Cook's Ridge Trail.  The Forest Service claims that fishing is not very good in Cummins Creek, and due to the fragile condition of the soil in the wilderness, horseback riding is not allowed.

See also
 List of Oregon Wildernesses
 List of U.S. Wilderness Areas
 List of old growth forests

References

Gallery

External links
 Siuslaw National Forest

Siuslaw National Forest
Wilderness areas of Oregon
Oregon Coast Range
Protected areas of Lane County, Oregon
Old-growth forests
Oregon Coast
IUCN Category Ib
1984 establishments in Oregon